Basketball Club Slavija (Serbian Cyrillic: КК Славија) is a basketball club from the City of East Sarajevo, Bosnia and Herzegovina. Currently, KK Slavija competes in the National Championship of Bosnia and Herzegovina.

References

Basketball teams in Bosnia and Herzegovina
Istočno Sarajevo
Sport in Republika Srpska